Zaccaria Cometti (7 January 1937 – 2 April 2020) was an Italian professional footballer.

Biography
He spent the majority of his career at Atalanta in Serie A.

Cometti died from COVID-19 on 2 April 2020.

References

External links
 

1937 births
2020 deaths
People from Romano di Lombardia
Association football goalkeepers
Deaths from the COVID-19 pandemic in Lombardy
Italian footballers
Atalanta B.C. players
A.C. Trento 1921 players
Serie A players
Sportspeople from the Province of Bergamo
Footballers from Lombardy